The 2001–02 NHL season was the 85th regular season of the National Hockey League. Thirty teams competed in an 82-game regular season. The regular season began on October 3, and the playoffs concluded on June 13, with the Detroit Red Wings defeating the Carolina Hurricanes in the Stanley Cup Finals in five games, winning their tenth Stanley Cup in franchise history.

League business
The cash-strapped Pittsburgh Penguins, desperate to dump payroll, could no longer afford perennial superstar Jaromir Jagr. He would be traded, along with Frantisek Kucera, to the Washington Capitals in exchange for Kris Beech, Ross Lupaschuk, Michal Sivek, and $4.9 million. Despite Mario Lemieux's return the previous season, the absence of Jagr proved devastating to the Penguins, and they missed the playoffs for the first time since 1990. The Penguins did not return to the playoffs until they drafted Sidney Crosby in 2005.

The Dallas Stars moved their home games from Reunion Arena to American Airlines Center.

The NHL honored the victims of 9/11 by having all players wear a patch on their jerseys, a ribbon sticker on the back of their helmet, as well as a red, white and blue ribbon painted on the ice behind each net, (with the Canadian teams having a red and white ribbon painted on the ice behind either net). On September 20, 2001, in the middle of a pre-season game between the Philadelphia Flyers and New York Rangers with both teams tied up 2–2, nine days after the attacks, the game was stopped. A message from United States President George W. Bush about the 9/11 attacks was broadcast on the arena video screen. After the message, the game did not resume and was declared a 2–2 tie.

Uniform updates
The NHL honored the victims of the September 11 attacks by having all players wear a patch on their jerseys, a ribbon sticker on the back of their helmet, as well as a red, white and blue ribbon painted on the ice behind each net, (with the Canadian teams having a red and white ribbon painted on the ice behind either net).

Buffalo Sabres: In the wake of the 9/11 terrorist attacks, the Sabres, in a sign of solidarity, took to the ice at Madison Square Garden on October 7 wearing jerseys reading "New York" on the front. Like the New York Rangers, their opponents in that game, the Sabres play their home games in the state of New York.

Colorado Avalanche: The Avalanche introduce a third jersey, with the word "Colorado" slanted across the front of the jersey.

Columbus Blue Jackets: The numbers become more narrow and the names on the back shrink slightly.

Edmonton Oilers: The team introduces an alternate jersey, featuring silver in place of bronze and red. The crest is their new Alternate logo with an oil bolt with 5 rivets for the team's 5 Stanley Cup titles.

Los Angeles Kings: The Kings wore two patches. On the upper right chest was the All-Star Game patch, as the Kings were the hosts of the 2002 All-Star Game. On the upper left chest is a patch with the letters "AM," for director of scouting Garnet "Ace" Bailey and scout Mark Bavis, who were killed aboard United Airlines Flight 175 on September 11, 2001.

Nashville Predators: The Predators unveil a mustard yellow alternate jersey.

New York Rangers: In the wake of the 9/11 terrorist attacks, the Rangers wore ribbons on their uniforms in memory of the victims. Also in their October 7 game at Madison Square Garden against the Buffalo Sabres, both teams wore "New York" on their jerseys. For the Rangers, it was a return of sorts to the blue jerseys they wore from 1978 to 1987.

Ottawa Senators: The Senators wore special stickers on their helmets marking their 10th season in the NHL.

Philadelphia Flyers: The orange jersey is retired, leaving the black jersey to be worn on the road full time. In a "spooky" kind of way, the Philadelphia Flyers took to (what was then known as) the First Union Center ice on Halloween night 2001 wearing the orange jerseys that were thought to have been retired in the offseason. The jerseys brought good luck to the Flyers that night, as they shut out the Pittsburgh Penguins, 3–0. In a show of support for New York's finest and bravest, the Flyers wore three special patches at the bottom of the back of the jersey. From left to right, they were "FDNY," the American flag, and "NYPD." The jerseys were auctioned off after the game to benefit the NHL's Twin Towers fund.

San Jose Sharks: The Sharks introduce a new black alternate jersey.

Tampa Bay Lightning: Team has a font change due to fan complaints deeming them unreadable. Also, the Lightning wore a patch to celebrate their 10th NHL season.

Toronto Maple Leafs: In honor of the 75th anniversary of the St. Pats becoming the Maple Leafs, the team wears vintage St. Pats jerseys in their game against the Buffalo Sabres on March 2. During the rest of the season, they wore special stickers on their helmets celebrating the 75th anniversary of the Maple Leafs.

Vancouver Canucks: A new alternate jersey is introduced, featuring a torso that changes from navy blue to maroon. The jersey features a redesigned Canuck Place patch.

Washington Capitals: The Capitals wore a patch in memory of the victims of the 9/11 terrorist attacks.

Regular season
For the second time in three seasons, no player reached the 100-point plateau. In addition, for the first time since 1980, the Art Ross Trophy was not won by either Wayne Gretzky, Mario Lemieux, or Jaromir Jagr. Instead, the award went to Jarome Iginla, who scored 96 points.

Final standings
The Detroit Red Wings placed first in the league standings and received home-ice advantage throughout the playoffs.
This is the first season that the Calgary Flames and Edmonton Oilers both missed the playoffs.

Note: W = Wins, L = Losses, T = Ties, OTL = Overtime Losses, GF= Goals For, GA = Goals Against, Pts = Points

Eastern Conference

Teams in bold qualified for the playoffs.

Western Conference

Teams in bold qualified for the playoffs.

Playoffs

Stanley Cup Finals

The Finals were contested by the Western Conference champion Detroit Red Wings and the Eastern Conference champion Carolina Hurricanes. It was Detroit's twenty-second appearance in the Finals, their last appearance being a win in 1998. It was Carolina's first appearance in the Finals in franchise history. Detroit defeated Carolina in five games to win their tenth Stanley Cup championship in franchise history.

Playoff bracket

Awards
The NHL Awards presentation took place in Toronto.

All-Star teams

Player statistics

Scoring leaders
Note: GP = Games Played, G = Goals, A = Assists, Pts = Points

Leading goaltenders

Note: GP = Games played; Min - Minutes Played; GA = Goals against; GAA = Goals against average; W = Wins; L = Losses; T = Ties; SO = Shutouts

Source: 2003 NHL Yearbook

Coaches

Eastern Conference
Atlanta Thrashers: Curt Fraser
Boston Bruins: Robbie Ftorek
Buffalo Sabres: Lindy Ruff
Carolina Hurricanes: Paul Maurice
Florida Panthers: Duane Sutter and Mike Keenan
Montreal Canadiens: Michel Therrien
New Jersey Devils: Larry Robinson and Kevin Constantine
New York Islanders: Peter Laviolette
New York Rangers: Ron Low
Ottawa Senators: Jacques Martin
Philadelphia Flyers: Bill Barber
Pittsburgh Penguins: Ivan Hlinka and Rick Kehoe
Tampa Bay Lightning: John Tortorella
Toronto Maple Leafs: Pat Quinn
Washington Capitals: Ron Wilson

Western Conference
Mighty Ducks of Anaheim: Brian Murray
Calgary Flames: Greg Gilbert
Chicago Blackhawks: Brian Sutter
Colorado Avalanche: Bob Hartley
Columbus Blue Jackets: Dave King
Dallas Stars: Ken Hitchcock and Rick Wilson
Detroit Red Wings: Scotty Bowman
Edmonton Oilers: Craig MacTavish
Los Angeles Kings: Andy Murray
Minnesota Wild: Jacques Lemaire
Nashville Predators: Barry Trotz
Phoenix Coyotes: Bobby Francis
San Jose Sharks: Darryl Sutter
St. Louis Blues: Joel Quenneville
Vancouver Canucks: Marc Crawford

Milestones

Debuts
The following is a list of players of note who played their first NHL game in 2001–02 (listed with their first team, asterisk(*) marks debut in playoffs):

Ilya Bryzgalov, Mighty Ducks of Anaheim
Dany Heatley, Atlanta Thrashers
Ilya Kovalchuk, Atlanta Thrashers
Ales Kotalik, Buffalo Sabres
Henrik Tallinder, Buffalo Sabres
Erik Cole, Carolina Hurricanes
Tyler Arnason, Chicago Blackhawks
Radim Vrbata, Colorado Avalanche
Pavel Datsyuk, Detroit Red Wings
Sean Avery, Detroit Red Wings
Kristian Huselius, Florida Panthers
Stephen Weiss, Florida Panthers
Nick Schultz, Minnesota Wild
Martin Erat, Nashville Predators
Brian Gionta, New Jersey Devils
Raffi Torres, New York Islanders
Trent Hunter*, New York Islanders
Chris Neil, Ottawa Senators
Vesa Toskala, San Jose Sharks
Barret Jackman, St. Louis Blues
Alex Auld, Vancouver Canucks

Last games
The following is a list of players of note that played their last game in the NHL in 2001–02 (listed with their last team):
 Steve Duchesne, Detroit Red Wings
 Ray Ferraro, St. Louis Blues
 Grant Ledyard, Tampa Bay Lightning
 John MacLean, Dallas Stars
 Dave Manson, Dallas Stars
 Stephane Richer, New Jersey Devils
 Kevin Stevens, Pittsburgh Penguins
 Gary Suter, San Jose Sharks
 Rick Tocchet, Philadelphia Flyers
 John Vanbiesbrouck, New Jersey Devils
 Pat Verbeek, Dallas Stars
 Mike Vernon, Calgary Flames

Trading deadline
Trading deadline: March 19, 2002.
March 19, 2002: Anaheim traded C Dave Roche to NY Islanders for RW Ben Guite and the rights to RW Bjorn Melin.
March 19, 2002: Atlanta traded D Jiri Slegr to Detroit for C Yuri Butsayev and Detroit's third-round pick in the 2002 Entry Draft.
March 19, 2002: Atlanta traded LW Darcy Hordichuk and Atlanta's fourth and fifth-round picks in the 2002 Entry Draft to Phoenix for D Kirill Safronov, the rights to RW Ruslan Zainullin and Phoenix's fourth-round pick in the 2002 Entry Draft.
March 19, 2002: Atlanta traded C Bob Corkum to Buffalo for Buffalo's fifth-round pick in the 2002 Entry Draft.
March 19, 2002: Boston traded LW Greg Crozier to Minnesota for LW Darryl Laplante.
March 19, 2002: Boston traded D Bobby Allen to Edmonton for D Sean Brown.
March 19, 2002: Chicago traded D Jaroslav Spacek and Chicago's second-round pick in the 2003 Entry Draft to Columbus for D Lyle Odelein.
March 19, 2002: Columbus traded RW Blake Sloan to Calgary for D Jamie Allison.
March 19, 2002: Colorado Avalanche obtain D Darius Kasparaitis from Pittsburgh for D Rick Berry and LW Ville Nieminen.
March 19, 2002: New Jersey Devils obtain Joe Nieuwendyk and Jamie Langenbrunner from the Dallas Stars for Jason Arnott, Randy McKay and 2002 first-round draft pick (Daniel Paille, later traded).
March 19, 2002: Edmonton Oilers traded D Tom Poti and C Rem Murray to the New York Rangers for C Mike York and the Rangers' fourth-round pick in the 2002 Entry Draft (Ivan Koltsov).
March 19, 2002: Florida traded D Darren Van Impe to NY Islanders for the Islanders' fifth-round pick in the 2003 Entry Draft.
March 19, 2002: Florida traded D Jeff Norton to Boston for Boston's sixth-round pick in the 2002 Entry Draft.
March 19, 2002: Los Angeles traded G Stephane Fiset to Montreal for future considerations.
March 19, 2002: Nashville traded D Richard Lintner to the New York Rangers for D Peter Smrek.
March 19, 2002: Pittsburgh traded RW Stephane Richer to New Jersey for a conditional pick in the 2003 Entry Draft.
March 19, 2002: Washington Capitals traded C Adam Oates to Philadelphia Flyers for G Maxime Ouellet and Philadelphia's first, second and third-round picks in the 2002 Entry Draft (Martin Vagner, Maxime Daigneault and Derek Krestanovich).
March 18, 2002: Florida Panthers traded Pavel Bure and 2002 second-round draft pick (Lee Falardeau) to the New York Rangers for Igor Ulanov, rights to Filip Novak and 2002 first and second-round draft picks (Petr Taticek and Rob Globke).

Hat tricks

See also
List of Stanley Cup champions
2001 NHL Entry Draft
52nd National Hockey League All-Star Game
NHL All-Star Game
NHL All-Rookie Team
Ice hockey at the 2002 Winter Olympics
2001 in sports
2002 in sports

References
 
 
Notes

External links
Hockey Database
http://nhl.com/

 
1
1